Jonathan Lobert (born 30 April 1985 at Metz)  is a French sailor. He competed at the 2012 Summer Olympics in the Men's Finn class, where he obtained the bronze medal.

References

External links
 
 
 

1985 births
Living people
Sportspeople from Metz
French male sailors (sport)
Olympic sailors of France
Olympic medalists in sailing
Olympic bronze medalists for France
Sailors at the 2012 Summer Olympics – Finn
Sailors at the 2016 Summer Olympics – Finn
Medalists at the 2012 Summer Olympics
Knights of the Ordre national du Mérite
Green Comm Racing sailors